Aviation is the design, development, production, operation, and use of aircraft, especially heavier-than-air aircraft.  Articles related to aviation include:

A
Aviation accidents and incidents
– ADF
– Adverse yaw
– Aerobatics
– Aerodrome
– Aerodrome mapping database (AMDB)
– Aerodynamics
– Aerofoil
-Aerodrome beacon
– Aeronautical Information Manual (AIM)
– Aeronautical chart
– Aeronautical phraseology
– Aeronautics
– Aerospace
– Aerospace engineering
– Aileron
– Air Charter
– Air defense identification zone (ADIZ)
– Air Freight Terminal
– Air traffic flow management
– Airband
– Aircraft maintenance engineer (AME)
– Aircraft maintenance technician (AMT)
– Aircraft registration
– Aircraft
– Aircraft engine controls
– Aircraft lavatory
– Aircraft noise
– Airfoil
– Airline Transport Pilot License
– Airline
– Airliner
– Air navigation
– Airport/Facility Directory (A/FD)
– Airport
- Airports Commission
– Aviation safety
– Airship
– Airshow
– Airspace classes
– Airspeed
– Airspeed indicator
– Air traffic control
– Air traffic controllers' strike of 1981
– Altimeter
– Altitude
– Angel Flight
– Angle of attack
– Angle of incidence
– Anhedral
– Anti-torque pedals (Helicopter rudder pedals)
– Artificial horizon
– Aspect ratio (wing)
– Assisted take-off
– Attitude indicator
– Automatic dependent surveillance – broadcast
– Automatic Terminal Information Service (ATIS)
– Autorotation (helicopter)
– Autorotation (fixed-wing aircraft)
– Autopilot
– Aviation
– Aviation archaeology
– Aviation history
– Aviation medical examiner (AME)
– Aviation safety
– Aviation system
– Aviator
– Avionics

B
Balloon (aircraft)
– Bird strike
– Blast pad
– Blimp
– §Bypass ratio

C
Canard
– Center of gravity (aircraft)
– Chord (aircraft)
– Circuit (airfield)
– Civil Air Patrol (US Air Force Auxiliary)
– Civil Aviation Authority (CAA)
– Cockpit
– Cockpit voice recorder
– Coefficient of lift
– Coefficient of moment
– Collective
– Commercial pilot license
– Common-use self-service (CUSS)
– Compass
– Compressor stall
– Controlled airspace
– CVFR
– Crab landing
– Cross control
– CTAF
– Cyclic

D
Deep stall
– Delta wing
– Dihedral
– Distance measuring equipment (DME)
– Drag
– Ducted fan
– dumb-bell
– Dutch roll

E
Elevator
– Elevon
– Emergency locator transmitter ELT
– Empennage (tail section)
– ETOPS
– Experimental aircraft
– Eurocontrol (European Organisation for the Safety of Air Navigation)
– Empty weight
– Environmental and climate impacts of aviation

F
Federal Aviation Administration (FAA – US authority)
– Fixed-base operator
– Flame holder
– Flap
– Flight
– Flight control surfaces
– Flight data recorder
– Flight envelope protection
– Flight instruments
– Flight level
– Flight management system
– Flight plan
– Flight planning
– Flight simulator
– Flight training
– Fly-by-wire
– Flying
– Flying car
– Flying families
– Flying wing
– Form drag
- From the Ground Up (book) 
- Flight information service

G
General aviation
– Glass cockpit
– Glider aircraft
– Glider (sailplane)
– Glider pilot certificate
– Gliding
– Go around
– GPS
– Great-circle distance
– Ground effect

H
Heading indicator
– Hold (aviation)
– History of aviation
– Helicopter
– Helicopter flight controls
– Hypermobility

I
ICAO spelling alphabet
– Instrument flight rules (IFR)
– Instrument landing system (ILS)
– Instrument rating
– Indicated airspeed
– International Air Transport Association (IATA)
– International Civil Aviation Organization (ICAO)
– Integrated engine pressure ratio (IEPR)
– International Fighter Pilots Academy (IFPA)
- Instrument meteorological conditions

J
Jet Airliner
– Jet engine
– Jetliner
– Jetway
– Joystick

L
Landing
– Landing T
– Leading-edge extension
– Lift (force)
– Lift-induced drag
– Light-sport aircraft

M
Maintenance
– METAR
– Meteorology
– Maintenance, repair and overhaul

N
Nautical airmile
– Navigation
– Non-directional beacon (NDB)
– Non-towered airport
– Night aviation regulations in the US
- Navigation light
-NOTAM

O
Oshkosh Airshow
– Overhead join

P
Performance envelope
– Pilot controlled lighting
– Pilot licenses
– Pilot licensing and certification
– Pilot reports (PIREPS)
– Precision approach path indicator
– Private pilot license
– Propeller
– Pushback

Q
QFE
– QNH
– Q code

R
Radar
– Reciprocating engines
– Red square
– Relaxed stability
– RIAT
– Roadable aircraft
– Rogallo wing
– Rudder
– Ruddervator
– Rule of three (aviation)
– Runway
– Run-up (aviation)

S
Sectional chart
– Signal square
– Spatial disorientation
– Spar
– Spin (flight)
– Spoiler (aeronautics)
– Slats
– Slip landing
– specific fuel consumption (propeller engines)
– Specific fuel consumption (thrust) (jet engines)
– Sport pilot certificate
– Stall (flight)
– Standard day
– Stick shaker
– Student pilot certificate
– Swedish Civil Aviation Administration
– Swing-wing

T
T-tail
– Takeoff
– Taxiing
– Taxiway
– Terminal area chart
– Thrust vectoring
– Traffic pattern indicator
– Transatlantic flight
– True airspeed
– Turbine engine
– Turn and bank indicator

U
Uncontrolled airport (see Non-towered airport)
– Uncontrolled airspace

V
V speeds
– V-tail
– Vertical speed indicator
– Vertical stabilizer (fin)
– Visual flight rules (VFR)
– VNE 
– VOR VHF omni-range (type of navigational beacon)
- Visual meteorological conditions

W
Waverider
– Wide-body aircraft
– Wind shear
– Wing
– Winglet
– World aeronautical chart

See also

Aviation-related lists
Outlines of sciences
Wikipedia indexes